Stephanie Davis (born in Montana) is an American country music singer and songwriter. She has written songs for Shelby Lynne, Garth Brooks, Waylon Jennings and Martina McBride. In addition, Davis has released five studio albums: a self-titled debut on Asylum Records in 1993, followed by four self-released albums. Her self-titled debut produced a chart single in "It's All in the Heart".

Biography
Stephanie Davis was born and raised in Montana. She later moved to Tennessee, where she worked as a songwriter, with cuts by Shelby Lynne, and Martina McBride. Garth Brooks also recorded several of her songs, including "The Gift",  "Wolves", "We Shall Be Free" (a top 20 single), "Learning to Live Again" (a top 5 success), "The Night Will Only Know", and "We Belong to Each Other". Brooks also signed her as an opening act in 1993, and she also joined his road band. She can be seen performing with Brooks' band during the concerts in Dublin at Croke Park and in New York at Central Park.

She released an album for Asylum Records in late 1993. This album produced the single "It's All in the Heart", which spent two weeks on the Billboard Hot Country Singles & Tracks (now Hot Country Songs) charts in 1993, peaking at No. 72. She moved back to Montana and began recording albums on Recluse Records, a label that she founded herself. These albums were 1996's I'm Pulling Through, 1998's River of No Return, 2004's Crocus in the Snow, and 2004's Home for the Holidays, a Christmas album.

In 2009, she released two more albums on Recluse, Western Bliss and Western Bling. These albums were released simultaneously and only contain one original composition.

Discography

Albums

Singles

References

Living people
Country musicians from Montana
American women country singers
American country singer-songwriters
American women singer-songwriters
Asylum Records artists
Songwriters from Montana
Year of birth missing (living people)
21st-century American women